Aeroflot Flight 3739 was a Soviet domestic passenger flight from Irkutsk to Leningrad (now Saint Petersburg) with a stopover in Kurgan. On March 8, 1988, after the Tupolev Tu-154 operating the flight had left Kurgan, it was hijacked by the Ovechkin family, whose members sought to defect from the Soviet Union. 

The Ovechkin family demanded the crew fly the aircraft to London. However, the flight engineer persuaded them to allow a stopover in Finland for refueling. The aircraft instead landed at the Soviet military airbase Veshchevo, near the Finnish border, where it was stormed by the incident response team of the Soviet interior ministry. During the incident, four hostages were killed and five hijackers committed suicide. Two surviving prosecutable members of the family were sentenced to eight and six years in prison, respectively. One of the crew was awarded the Order of the Red Banner as a result of the incident.

Background
The Ovechkin family were from Sosnovka in what is now Perm Krai. At the time of the incident the family consisted of twelve members: mother Nina (Ninel) and her eleven children (seven sons and four daughters). One of the daughters, Lyudmila, did not participate in the hijacking as she was married and lived in another city. After giving birth to the tenth of her eleven children, Ninel was awarded the Soviet distinction of "Mother Heroine". 

Following the death of her husband Dmitry in 1984, Ninel raised her children by herself in Irkutsk, Irkutsk Oblast. The boys started a local music band called the Seven Simeons. Following the band's tour of Japan, the Ovechkin family decided to leave the Soviet Union and settle abroad, which was usually not allowed by the government. Although they could have simply refused to return to their country from one of their trips abroad like numerous Soviet citizens had already done, the Ovechkins decided to hijack an aircraft. They left a note claiming they were going to meet relatives and boarded a Aeroflot airliner flying from Irkutsk to Leningrad (now Saint Petersburg).

Hijacking
Preparing for hijacking, the Ovechkins acquired arms and made two sawed-off shotguns from them. In case of failure the Ovechkins decided to blow themselves up rather than face arrest. The family hid their weapons and explosive devices in a double bass, which could not be scanned by airport security devices due to its size. They had previously checked the security system during a test flight to Leningrad. During the boarding on Flight 3739, airport personnel offered to place the double bass in the luggage section; the Ovechkins refused and paid extra for it to be transported in the cabin. The double bass was checked visually and allowed in the cabin.

Before landing in Leningrad, near Vologda, the flight crew received a note from the hijackers through a flight attendant reading: "Proceed to England (London). Do not descend. Otherwise we will blow up the plane. You are under our control." (The note was subsequently burned in the cabin). The captain transmitted a distress signal and reported the emergency to Vologda air traffic control. On the ground, Operation Nabat ("Alarm Bell") was commenced. One of the flight attendants informed the passengers that they were about to land in the Finnish city of Kotka, when in fact the ground services ordered the captain to land at the Soviet air base at Veshchevo. The flight engineer had earlier persuaded the hijackers that the aircraft needed to refuel in order to reach London.

Shortly before landing, the hijackers realized that they were in fact still in Soviet territory. One of the hijackers, Dmitry Ovechkin Jr, killed flight attendant Tamara Zharkaya, 28. After the aircraft landed, five incident response team members in bulletproof vests stormed the cockpit. From there, eyewitnesses reported, they fired indiscriminately into the cabin. Another group stormed the aircraft from the rear. One of the Ovechkins shouted via the intercom to the crew: "Commander, tell them not to shoot!" During the storming of the aircraft, Alexander Ovechkin detonated his explosive device and died; the explosion had limited effect and only led to a fire in the aircraft's tail section which was extinguished by crew. Ninel ordered Dmitry to shoot her. Four other members of the Ovechkin family also shot themselves (Vasily, 26; Dmitry, 24; Oleg, 21 and Alexander, 19). Six other members of the family, who were on board, survived the incident (Olga, 28; Igor, 17; Tatiana, 14; Mikhail, 13; Ulyana, 10 and Sergei, 9).

In addition to Zharkaya, fatalities among hostages included three passengers (two women aged 69 and 70, and one man aged 24) who were accidentally killed during the storming of the aircraft. About twenty passengers were injured (thirty-six according to another estimate); fourteen of them were injured severely.

Aftermath
The two oldest surviving Ovechkins, Igor and Olga, were tried on September 6, 1988, and sentenced to eight and six years in prison, respectively. While in prison, Olga gave birth to her daughter Larisa. Subsequently, Olga was beaten to death by her boyfriend on June 8, 2003.

In the aftermath of the hijacking, the norms of Soviet airport security were revised and the safety of hostages was prioritised. The revised practices prevented deaths, particularly during the 1988 Ordzhonikidze bus hijacking and the 1990 Soviet aircraft hijackings.

Zharkaya, who tried to appease the hijackers but was ultimately killed by one of them, received the Order of the Red Banner posthumously.

In popular culture
The incident was adapted into the 1999 film Mama by Russian director Denis Yevstigneyev.

References

Accidents and incidents involving the Tupolev Tu-154
3739
Aircraft hijackings
Aviation accidents and incidents in 1988
1988 in the Soviet Union
Soviet defectors to the United Kingdom
Aviation accidents and incidents in the Soviet Union
Mass murder in 1988
March 1988 events in Asia
Murder in the Soviet Union
Terrorist incidents in the Soviet Union in the 1980s
Terrorist incidents in Europe in 1988
Terrorist incidents in Asia in 1988
1988 murders in the Soviet Union